Martin Mrva (born 12 December 1971) is a Slovakian chess grandmaster. He achieved his highest Elo rating of 2512 in 2005.

He won the Slovakia Championship in 1989, he is the second vicechampion of students in 1992 in Odese, in zonal tournament in Budapešt 2000 took 5th place, he is winner of grandmaster tournaments in Budapešt 1993, Piešťany 2004. Grandmaster title achieved in 2005. He is author of CD Učim sa hrať šach (I learn to play chess) and publisher of portals c7c5.com and www.64.sk.

Private life
Martin Mrva is married to a Slovak chess player, Woman International Master Alena Mrvová (née Bekiarisová).

References
https://theweekinchess.com/html/twic294.html#5

External links 
 
 CD Učim sa hrať šach
 Portal c7c5.com
 Portal 64.sk
 Chess Revue
 Photo of Martin Mrva

1971 births
Living people
Chess grandmasters
Slovak chess players
Sportspeople from Prešov